Asad ibn Saman was an early Samanid. He was the son of Saman Khuda, the founder of the Samanid dynasty of Persia.

According to tradition, Asad was named by his father in honor of the Caliphal governor of Khurasan Asad ibn 'Abd Allah al-Qasri (723-727), who had converted Saman to Islam. Asad had four sons: Nuh, Ahmad, Yahya, and Ilyas. Caliph al-Mamun appointed Asad's sons to be rulers of Samarqand, Ferghana, Shash and Ustrushana, and Hirat, and thus the dynasty of rulers was started. The famous Samanid ruler Ismail I (Ismail Samani) (892-907) was Asad's grandson and the son of Ahmad.

Sources

External links
To the Question of the Origin of the Samanids by Shamsiddin S. Kamoliddin, in Transoxiana 10, July 2005.

Samanids
8th-century monarchs in Asia
8th-century Iranian people
8th-century people from the Abbasid Caliphate